Spaniard Knob or Spaniards Knob are the names of two distinct mountains in the Towns County, Georgia.

Spaniard Mountain most likely was named for the travels of Spanish conquistador Juan Pardo. A variant name is "Spaniard Knob".

A variant name is Rocky Knob. The Appalachian Trail goes along the northern slope of the mountain.

Gallery

References

Mountains of Towns County, Georgia
Mountains of Georgia (U.S. state)